This is a list of Danish aircraft of World War II. Nazi Germany banned Denmark from having aircraft when they occupied the country, so you will not find any aircraft after 1940.

Fighters 
 Bristol Bulldog
 Gloster Gauntlet
 Fokker D.XXI

Naval fighters 
 Hawker Nimrod/Nimrodderne

Bombers 
 Fokker C.V
 Hawker Dantorp

Reconnaissance 
 Heinkel HE 8

Trainers 
 Avro Tutor
 de Havilland Tiger Moth

Other 
 Cierva C.30

References

World War II military equipment of Denmark